Mihăileni is a commune in Briceni District, Moldova. It is composed of two villages, Groznița and Mihăileni.

References

Communes of Briceni District